Girard may refer to:

Places in the United States
Girard, Alabama
Girard, Georgia
Girard, Illinois
Girard, Kansas
Girard, Michigan
Girard, Minnesota
Girard, Ohio
Girard, Pennsylvania
Girard, Texas
Girard, West Virginia
Girard Township, Macoupin County, Illinois
Girard Township, Michigan
Girard Township, Minnesota
Girard Township, Erie County, Pennsylvania
Girard Township, Clearfield County, Pennsylvania
 Girard Avenue, a street in Philadelphia, Pennsylvania, served by two SEPTA stations:
Girard station (Broad Street Line), a subway station on serving the Broad Street Line
Girard station (SEPTA Market-Frankford Line), a rapid transit station on Market-Frankford Line
SEPTA Route 15, a trolley line also known as the Girard Avenue Line
Woodland Hills, Los Angeles, California, was known as Girard until 1941

People with the given name
 Girard I of Roussillon (died 1113), count of Roussillon
 Girard II of Roussillon (died 1172), count of Roussillon
 Gerard la Pucelle (1117–1184), Anglo-French scholar of canon law, clerk, and Bishop of Coventry
 Girard of Buonalbergo, Norman chieftain in the middle of the eleventh century in the Mezzogiorno
 Girard Cavalaz (1225–1247), Italian troubadour from Lombardy
 Girard Desargues (1591–1661), French mathematician and engineer, considered one of the founders of projective geometry
 Girard "Gerry" McDonald (born 1958), American ice hockey player
 Patrick Girard, French engineer
 Jean-Yves Girard, French logician
 René Girard, French philosopher, historian, and literary critic

Other uses
 Girard (surname)
 Girard (grape), red wine grape that is also known as Carignan
 Girard-Perregaux, Swiss manufacturer of complex timepieces
 Girard College, private philanthropic boarding school in Philadelphia, Pennsylvania
 Girard Estate, Philadelphia, Pennsylvania

See also
 Giraud
 Gerard
 Girardin (disambiguation)
 Girardot (disambiguation)
 Girardville (disambiguation)